Schistura larketensis is a species of ray-finned fish in the genus Schistura. This cavefish is found in the East Jaintia Hills district in the Indian state of Meghalaya. It is named after the Larket village, where the fish was found inside a cave.

References 

L
Cave fish
Fish described in 2017